In early August 1972, the President of Uganda Idi Amin ordered the expulsion of his country's Indian minority, giving them 90 days to leave the country. At the time of the expulsion, there were about 80,000 individuals of Indian descent in Uganda, of whom 23,000 had their applications for citizenship both processed and accepted. The expulsion took place against the backdrop of anti-Indian sentiment and black supremacy in Uganda, with Amin accusing a minority of the Asians of disloyalty, non-integration, and commercial malpractice, claims that Indian leaders disputed. Amin defended the expulsion by arguing that he was "giving Uganda back to ethnic Ugandans".

Many of those who were expelled were citizens of the United Kingdom and Colonies and 27,200 emigrated to the United Kingdom. Of the other refugees who were accounted for, 6,000 went to Canada, 4,500 refugees ended up in India and 2,500 went to nearby Kenya or to Pakistan. In total, some 5,655 firms, ranches, farms, and agricultural estates were confiscated, along with cars, homes and other household goods.

Background 
The presence of South Asians in Uganda was the result of deliberate choices by the British administration (1894–1962). They were brought to the Uganda Protectorate by the British to "serve as a buffer between Europeans and Africans in the middle rungs of commerce and administration". In addition, in the 1890s, 32,000 labourers from British India were brought to Southeast Africa under indentured labour contracts to work on the construction of the Uganda Railway. Most of the surviving Indians returned home, but 6,724 individuals decided to remain in the African Great Lakes after the line's completion. At the time of the expulsion, there were approximately 80,000 individuals of South Asian descent in Uganda, of whom 23,000 had had their applications for citizenship both processed and accepted. A further 50,000 were British passport holders, though Amin himself used the apparently exaggerated figure of 80,000 British passport holders in his initial expulsion speech.

The British had invested in the education of the Asian minority, in preference to that of indigenous Ugandans. By the early 1970s, many Indians in Southeast Africa and Uganda were employed in the sartorial and banking businesses and Indophobia was already engrained by the start of Amin's rule in February 1971. While not all Ugandan Asians were well off, they were on average better off than the indigenous communities, constituting 1% of the population while earning a fifth of the national income. Indians were stereotyped as "merely traders" and labelled as "dukawallas" (an occupational term that degenerated into an anti-Indian slur during Amin's time), who tried to cheat unsuspecting purchasers and looked out only for their own families. Racial segregation was institutionalised. Gated ethnic communities served elite healthcare and schooling services. Additionally, the tariff system in Uganda had historically been oriented toward the economic interests of South Asian traders.

Milton Obote's government had pursued a policy of "Africanisation" which included policies targeted at Ugandan Asians. The 1968 Committee on the "Africanisation in Commerce and Industry", for example, had made far-reaching Indophobic proposals and a system of work permits and trade licences was introduced in 1969 to restrict the role of non-citizen Indians in economic and professional activities. Nevertheless, Amin's policies represented a significant acceleration. In August 1971, Amin announced a review of the citizenship status awarded to Uganda's Asian community, followed by the declaration of a census of Uganda's Asian population in October that year. In order to resolve the "misunderstandings" regarding the role of Uganda's Asian minority in society, he convened an Indian 'conference' for 7–8 December. In a memorandum presented on the second day of the conference, he set out his hope that "the wide gap" between Ugandan Asians and Africans would narrow. While paying tribute to Indians' contribution to the economy and the professions, he accused a minority of the Asian population of disloyalty, non-integration and commercial malpractice, claims Indian leaders disputed. On the vexed question of citizenship, he said his government would recognise citizenship rights already granted, but all outstanding applications for citizenship (which by this point were thought to number more than 12,000) would be cancelled.

This expulsion of an ethnic minority was not the first in Uganda's history as the country's Kenyan minority, numbering approximately 30,000, had been expelled in 1969–70.

Expulsion 

On 4 August 1972, Amin declared that Britain would need to take on the responsibility for caring for British subjects who were of Indian origin, accusing them of "sabotaging Uganda's economy and encouraging corruption". The deadline for British subjects to leave was confirmed as three months, which came to mean 8 November. On 9 August, the policy was expanded to include citizens of India, Pakistan and Bangladesh. The position of the 23,000 Indians who had been granted Ugandan citizenship (and in particular those who held no other citizenship) was less clear. Not originally included, on 19 August, they were seemingly added to the list, before being re-exempted three days later following international protest. Many chose to leave rather than endure further intimidation, with only 4,000 known to have stayed. Exemptions for certain professions were added, then later removed.

The precise motivation for the expulsion remains unclear. Some of Amin's former supporters suggest that it followed a dream in which, he claimed, Allah had told him to expel them, as well as plot vengeance against the British government for refusing to provide him with arms to invade Tanzania. Amin defended the expulsion by arguing that he was giving Uganda back to the ethnic Ugandans:

The expulsion and redistribution of property were officially termed "Operation Mafuta Mingi". Ugandan soldiers during this period engaged in theft and physical and sexual violence against the Indians with impunity. Restrictions were imposed on the sale or transfer of private businesses by Ugandan Indians and on 16 August Amin made it clear that after he was done with Indian-owned business, European-owned businesses would be next.

Impact 

Amin's decrees drew immediate worldwide condemnation, including from India. The Indian government warned Uganda of dire consequences, but took no action when Amin's government ignored the ultimatum. Initially, India maintained diplomatic ties with Uganda but later severed diplomatic relations with Amin's regime. The United Kingdom froze a £10.4 million loan which had been arranged the previous year; Amin ignored this. Journalists Tony Avirgan and Martha Honey described the expulsion as "the most explicitly racist policy ever adopted in black Africa."

Many of the Indians were citizens of the United Kingdom and Colonies and 27,200 refugees subsequently emigrated to the United Kingdom. Of the other refugees who were accounted for, 6,000 went to Canada, 4,500 ended up in India and 2,500 went to nearby Kenya. Malawi, Pakistan, West Germany and the United States took 1,000 refugees each, with smaller numbers emigrating to Australia, Austria, Sweden, Norway, Mauritius and New Zealand. About 20,000 refugees were unaccounted for. Only a few hundred remained behind.

Reluctant to expand its newly introduced immigration quota, the British government had sought agreement from some of its remaining overseas territories (including Bermuda, the Virgin Islands, British Honduras, Hong Kong, Seychelles and the Solomon Islands) to resettle them; however, only the Falkland Islands responded positively. Kenya and Tanzania similarly closed their borders with Uganda to prevent an influx of refugees.

Some of those expelled were Nizari Ismaili Muslims. The Aga Khan IV, the Imam of Nizari Ismailis phoned his acquaintance Canadian Prime Minister Pierre Trudeau. Trudeau's government agreed to allow thousands of Nizari Ismailis to emigrate to Canada. The exodus of Ugandan Indians took on a new level of urgency in the September following a telegram from Amin to the UN Secretary General Kurt Waldheim, in which it appeared that Amin was sympathetic to Hitler's treatment of Jews and an airlift was organised. The UN dispatched the Executive Secretary of the Economic Commission for Africa, Robert K. A. Gardiner, who attempted in vain to convince Amin to reverse his decision.

A military committee was made responsible for the reallocation of the confiscated property, though Amin also personally redirected some material. In total, some 5,655 firms, ranches, farms, and agricultural estates were reallocated, along with cars, homes and other household goods. For political reasons, most (5,443) were reallocated to individuals, with 176 going to government bodies, 33 being reallocated to semi-state organisations and 2 going to charities. Possibly the biggest winner was the state-owned Uganda Development Corporation, which gained control over some of the largest enterprises, though both the rapid nature of the growth and the sudden lack of experienced technicians and managers proved a challenge for the corporation, resulting in a restructuring of the sector in 1974–75. Though some of the property fell into the hands of Uganda's traditional businessmen, most of the direct beneficiaries were soldiers and government officials. By the time Amin's regime collapsed in 1979, it was rumoured that there were no more than 50 Indians in Uganda.

Economic impact

Despite Amin's claims of returning control of the economy to ordinary Ugandans, the expulsion greatly harmed the economy of the country. The GDP of Uganda fell by 5% between 1972 and 1975, while manufacturing output tumbled from 740 million Ugandan shillings in 1972 to 254 million shillings in 1979. At the time of their deportation Asians owned 90% of the country's businesses and accounted for 90% of Uganda's tax revenue. The real value of salaries and wages plummeted by 90% in less than a decade following the expulsion, and although some of these businesses where handed over to native Ugandans this was ineffective as most did not know how to run them. Uganda's industrial sector which was seen as the backbone of the economy was damaged due to the lack of skilled workers.

Return 
Thousands of Indians returned to Uganda starting in 1986 when Yoweri Museveni assumed power. Museveni criticized Amin's policies and invited the Indians to return. According to Museveni, "Gujaratis have played a lead role in Uganda's social and industrial development. I knew that this community can do wonders for my country and they have been doing it for last many decades." The Indians resurfacing in Uganda have helped rebuild the economy of Uganda, and are financially well settled.

In popular culture 
 The 1976 Bollywood film Charas has a plot about the expulsion of Indians from Uganda.
 Sharad Patel's 1981 film Rise and Fall of Idi Amin portrays the events leading to the expulsion of Ugandan Asians to other countries.
 Mira Nair's 1991 film Mississippi Masala portrays the story of an Indian family which flees Uganda during the turmoil and settles in Mississippi.
 The expulsion was portrayed in the 1998 novel The Last King of Scotland and the subsequent 2006 film of the book.
 2001's The Feast of the Nine Virgins, published by Bogle L'Ouverture, London was a satirical novel about the Uganda expulsion by a former expellee, Jameela Siddiqi
 Siddiqi's 2006's followup Bombay Gardens also focuses on the Uganda expulsion
 The aftermath of the exile provides the backdrop for episode 2.6 of Life on Mars (2006).
 The expulsion is the main focus of the 2008 young adult novel Child of Dandelions by Shenaaz Nanji, which was a finalist for Canada's Governor General's Award.
 The 2012 memoir Shattered Lives: Sitting on Fire by Azim P H Somani, which was the main feature of the ITV documentary marking the 40th anniversary of the expulsion.
 Tanmay Srivastava 2020's short documentary 90 Days To Leave talks about the history of the Asians in Uganda, the expulsion and the hardships they faced in the aftermath.

See also 

Non-resident Indian and person of Indian origin
Indian diaspora in Southeast Africa

Notes

Bibliography 

 
 
 
 
 
 

 
 
 

1972 in Uganda
Anti-immigration politics in Africa
Anti-Indian racism in Africa
Asian diaspora in Uganda
Ethnic cleansing in Africa
Forced migration
History of Uganda
Persecution
Political history of Uganda
Xenophobia in Africa
Indian diaspora in Africa
Pakistan–Uganda relations